Fastest is a documentary film about the Grand Prix motorcycle racing, MotoGP. Filmed between 2010 and 2011 by director Mark Neale, it is narrated by Ewan McGregor and produced by Neale and Paul Taublieb. Fastest was preceded by The Doctor, The Tornado and The Kentucky Kid and will be succeeded by Charge, currently awaiting release.

Overview
Fastest  is a documentary of the 2010 Grand Prix motorcycle racing season.

Notable appearances
 Colin Edwards
 Jorge Lorenzo
 Valentino Rossi
 Marco Simoncelli
 Ben Spies
 Casey Stoner

The film includes appearances by the aforementioned 9-times World champion, Valentino Rossi (Fiat Yamaha), two-time champion, Casey Stoner (Ducati Corse), 2010 Champion Jorge Lorenzo (Fiat Yamaha), American former World Superbike Champions, Ben Spies (Yamaha Tech 3), and double-winner Colin Edwards (Yamaha Tech3). The film also features Marco Simoncelli, 2008 250cc GP World Champion, (Gresini Honda), during what was his rookie season in the MotoGP category.

Release
The film premiered at Leicester Square on 20 September 2011 and was attended by British riders Cal Crutchlow, Bradley Smith, Scott Redding, Danny Kent, Eugene Laverty. The event was hosted by Eurosport commentator Toby Moody, with a late appearance by fellow commentator Julian Ryder, and the BBC's Matt Roberts. The film was introduced with a short clip especially for the London Premier by Valentino Rossi.

The film is available on DVD in the US, UK and Canada.

References

External links
 

2011 films
American auto racing films
American sports documentary films
Documentary films about auto racing
Motorcycle racing films
2011 documentary films
Films scored by Tomandandy
2010s English-language films
Films directed by Mark Neale
2010s American films
Grand Prix motorcycle racing